Norman Shetler (born 16 June 1931, Dubuque, Iowa) is a pianist, puppeteer and puppet constructor, and piano professor. Originally from America, he now lives in Austria.

Life and career
Norman Shetler was born in Dubuque, Iowa in 1931. He planned to attend Juilliard, but before he could attend he was drafted into the army. During WWII, he served mostly as a typist.

While a student in Vienna, the Soviet Union funded his participation in the first Tchaikovsky Competition. There he met Van Cliburn. He also dreamed of studying with the Soviet virtuoso Sviatoslav Richter.

In 1955 he moved to Vienna, Austria, where he studied piano, graduating in 1959. He specialized in accompanying singers, having worked with Anneliese Rothenberger, Peter Schreier, Dietrich Fischer-Dieskau, Brigitte Fassbaender, Hermann Prey, Margaret Price and Thomas Quasthoff, and also with instrumentalists such as violinist Nathan Milstein and cellist Heinrich Schiff. Despite specializing in accompanying, he is also a soloist. He has been recorded over 70 times.

Between 1983 and 1991, Shetler taught Piano and Lied Accompaniment at the Würzburg School of Music and Drama. Since 1992, he has been a professor at the University of Music and Performing Arts in Vienna. He also teaches masterclasses, particularly at the Mozarteum University of Salzburg.

Shetler has also been a puppet maker and puppeteer since at least 1985. His show "Musical Puppet Cabaret" toured internationally, in festivals and on television.

Discography
 Franz Schubert: Winterreise D 911 (arr. Rummel) - Xaver Hutter, narrator; Martin Rummel, cello - paladino music pmr 0018 (2011)

References

External links
Library of Congress entry
Official Website of Norman Shetler
 Classic Online Complete discography of Norman Shetler

American puppeteers
Austrian pianists
Living people
1931 births
American male pianists
21st-century American pianists
21st-century American male musicians
American emigrants to Austria